Wanted is an American primetime police drama television series broadcast on the TNT network which was aired from July 31 to December 26, 2005. The series was created by Louis St. Clair and Jorge Zamacona, and executive produced by Aaron Spelling, E. Duke Vincent and Jorge Zamacona.

Synopsis
The show follows an elite taskforce, with members pulled from the different branches of law enforcement (DEA, United States Marshals, LAPD, ATF, FBI) as they track down Los Angeles's 100 most wanted fugitives and struggle to balance their work and personal lives.

Members of the task force include Conrad Rose (Gary Cole), the Team Leader from L.A. Metro SWAT who is considered the moral center of the unit; Jimmy McGloin (Ryan Hurst), an ATF agent and a bona fide card-carrying conservative; Carla Merced (Rashida Jones), a former Naval Intelligence officer and expert hostage negotiator; Tommy Rodriquez (Benjamín Benítez), an FBI agent not above using his good looks and charm to stop any criminal; Rodney Gronbeck (Josey Scott), an LAPD officer and a tech genius; Joe Vacco (Brendan Kelly), a DEA agent who is currently living at the team's warehouse headquarters after having getting kicked out of his own place; and Eddie Drake (Lee Tergesen), an eight-year veteran of the U.S. Marshals Service and graduate of the L.A. Metro Police Academy. As the team tracks down criminals, often using unconventional (and legally questionable) methods, they discover there is a fine line between justice and the law.

The series was canceled after the first season, at the end of a cliffhanger dealing with whether the group would be prosecuted for overstepping their bounds.

Cast
 Gary Cole as Lt. Conrad Rose
 Ryan Hurst as ATF Field Agent Jimmy McGloin
 Josey Scott as Rodney Gronbeck
 Joaquim de Almeida as Captain Manuel Valenza
 Benjamín Benítez as FBI Special Agent Tommy Rodriguez
 Alex Fernandez as Max Rubio
 Rashida Jones as Detective Carla Merced
 Brendan Kelly as DEA Officer Joe Vacco
 Vince Lozano as Ozzie Devine
 Dedee Pfeiffer as Lucinda Rose
 Karen Sillas as Mariah Belichek
 Lee Tergesen as Eddie Drake
 Dimitri Diatchenko as Dar Sitska

Episodes

References

External links
 
 TNT Site
 

2000s American crime drama television series
2000s American police procedural television series
2005 American television series debuts
2005 American television series endings
English-language television shows
TNT (American TV network) original programming
Television series by CBS Studios
Television shows set in Los Angeles
American detective television series
Television series by Spelling Television